The Mitsubishi 4N1 engine is a family of all-alloy four-cylinder diesel engines developed by Mitsubishi Motors, produced at the company's powertrain facility in Kyoto, Japan for use in Mitsubishi's small to mid-sized global passenger cars.

In June 2006, Mitsubishi Motors Mitsubishi Heavy Industries and Renault announced a joint development project for a new generation of clean diesel engines to be used in cars exported to Europe with a target of beginning mass production in 2010 and later announced that the engines will be gradually phased into other global markets.

The preliminary version of the  engine was first seen in the Concept-cX test car introduced in 2007. The larger  was first exhibited in the Concept-ZT test car introduced in the same year and later used in the Concept-RA test car introduced in 2008.

With a clean diesel emission performance in mind, all engines are designed to comply with Tier 2 Bin 5 emission regulations in the United States, Euro 5 standard in Europe and Japan's Post New Long Term regulations.

Together with Mitsubishi's electric vehicle technology the new diesel engines are positioned as a core element in the Mitsubishi Motors Environment Initiative Program 2010 (EIP 2010) announced in July 2006.

The 4N1 engine family is the world's first to feature a variable valve timing (intake side) system applied to passenger car diesel engines.

All engines developed within this family have aluminium cylinder block, double overhead camshaft layouts, 4 valves per cylinder, a common rail injection system with a variable-geometry turbocharger and MIVEC variable valve timing.

Engine family characteristics

The 4N13  uses solenoid fuel-injectors. The larger 4N14  engine uses piezo fuel-injectors that produce a finer fuel spray. Both engines feature a fast ceramic glowplug system. The engines are designed to operate at a lower compression ratio, thus lowering the combustion pressure, allowing the use of an aluminium cylinder block that reduces weight.

The 4N13  engine uses a Variable Geometry (VG) turbocharger with a variable vane turbine, which provides optimal boost pressure control for different driving conditions. The 4N14  engine also uses a VG turbocharger plus a Variable Diffuser (VD) that uses both variable geometry vanes in the turbine housing and a compressor with variable vanes in the diffuser passage, further improving combustion efficiency.

Within the engine, Mitsubishi used an offset angle crankshaft that reduces friction, therefore noise and vibration, allowing the engine to run smoothly and quietly at all engine speeds.

To meet the requirements of global emissions standards, Mitsubishi developed a new catalyst system that combines a Diesel Oxidation Catalyst (DOC), NOx Trap Catalyst (NTC) and Diesel Particulate Filter (DPF).

4N13

Specifications

Applications
2010 Mitsubishi ASX (RVR)
2010 Mitsubishi Lancer
2012 Peugeot 4008
2012 Citroën C4 Aircross

4N14

Specifications

Applications
2010 Mitsubishi Outlander
2012 Mitsubishi Delica D:5 (without variable timing, /)
2013 Mitsubishi ASX (with A/T only)
2017 Mitsubishi Eclipse Cross
2019 Mitsubishi L200 and L300 (without variable timing, /)

4N15

Specifications

Applications
2014 Mitsubishi Type 73 Light Truck
2015 Mitsubishi Triton/L200/Strada
2015 Mitsubishi Pajero Sport/Montero Sport/Shogun Sport

4N16

Specifications

Applications
2022 Nissan Caravan/Isuzu Como

See also
 List of Mitsubishi engines

References

External links
Mitsubishi Motors Japan Clean diesel page (JAPANESE)

4N1
Straight-four engines
Diesel engines by model